Keeravani (pronounced ) is a rāgam in Carnatic music (musical scale of South Indian classical music). It is the 21st Melakarta rāgam in the 72 melakarta rāgam system of Carnatic music.

This rāgam is a popular scale in western music as well. The Western equivalent is the Harmonic minor scale. It is said to be borrowed into Hindustani music from Carnatic music.

Structure and Lakshana 

It is the 3rd rāgam in the 4th chakra Veda. The mnemonic name is Veda-Go. The mnemonic phrase is sa ri gi ma pa dha nu. Its  structure (ascending and descending scale) is as follows (see swaras in Carnatic music for details on below notation and terms):
: 
: 
The notes used in this scale are chathusruthi rishabha, sadharana gandhara, suddha madhyama, panchama, suddha dhaivatha, kakali nishadha.

As it is a melakarta rāgam, by definition it is a sampoorna rāgam (has all seven notes in ascending and descending scale). It is the shuddha madhyamam equivalent of Simhendramadhyamam, which is the 57th melakarta.

 Janya Rāgams Keeravani has many janya rāgams (derived scales) associated with it. Kalyāna vasantam is a popular janya of Keeravani. See List of janya rāgams for full list of rāgams associated with Keeravani. Other popular janya ragams include Sāmapriya and Vasantamanohari.

 Compositions 
Many composers have composed songs in Keeravani. A few of them are listed here.Panca Bhoota Kiranavalim by Muthuswamy Dikshithar (Sanskrit)Kaligiyunte by Thyagaraja (Telugu)Ambavani nannu by Muthiah Bhagavatar (Telugu)Balasarasa Murali by Oottukkadu Venkata Kavi (Tamil)Bhavaye Saarasanabham by Swathi Thirunal Rama Varma (Sanskrit)Varamulosagi  by Patnam Subramania Iyer (Telugu)Devi neeye thunai by Papanasam Sivan (Tamil)nA puNyamu gAdA IshA by Muthiah Bhagavatar (Telugu)Sarvaparadhava By Purandara Dasaru (Kannada)nijamuga rAma nI pAdamula nitya nammina nnau brOvumu by Poochi Srinivasa Iyengar (Telugu)varamulosagi brOcuTa nI karudA jagadAdhara by Patnam Subramania Iyer (Telugu)Innamum Sandeha Padalamo by Gopalakrishna Bharathi (Tamil)Vinayagane vinaitheerpavane by Ulundhoorpettai Shanmugam (Tamil)nI caraNAmbujamunu neranammiti nIrajAkSi by G. N. Balasubramaniam (Telugu)Karunakarane Shivashankarane by Papanasam Sivan (Tamil)Mahadeshwara Ashtadashanama by Mahesh Mahadev (Sanskrit)Sri Dakshinamurthym by M. BalamuralikrishnaBhavaye Saadaram by ThulaseevanamVaananai mathi soodiya by Appar (Tamil)
 unnai nambinen aiya by muthuthandavar

 Tamil Film Songs 

 Janya Ragam:Rishipriya 

 Related rāgams 
This section covers the theoretical and scientific aspect of this rāgam.Keeravani's notes when shifted using Graha bhedam, yields 3 other major melakarta rāgams, namely, Hemavati, Vakulabharanam and Kosalam. For further details and an illustration refer Graha bhedam on Keeravani''.

Notes

References 

Melakarta ragas